Erizada rufa is a butterfly species described by George Hampson in 1905. Erizada rufa is included in the genus Erizada and the family Nolidae. No subspecies are listed in the Catalogue of Life.

References

Nolidae